Germanium disulfide or Germanium(IV) sulfide is the inorganic compound with the formula GeS2. It is a white high-melting crystalline solid. The compound is a 3-dimensional polymer, in contrast to silicon disulfide, which is a one-dimensional polymer.  The Ge-S distance is 2.19 Å.

History
Germanium disulfide was the first germanium compound found by Clemens Winkler, during the analysis of argyrodite. The fact that germanium sulfide does not dissolve in aqueous acid made it possible for Winkler to isolate the new element.

Production
Germanium disulfide is created by reacting hydrogen sulfide with germanium tetrachloride in a concentrated hydrochloric acid solution.

Natural occurrence
Natural GeS2 is restricted to fumaroles of some burning coal-mining waste heaps.

References

Germanium(IV) compounds
Sulfides
Dichalcogenides